This was the first edition of the tournament.

Marcus Daniell and David Marrero won the title after defeating Rameez Junaid and Andrei Vasilevski 6–4, 6–4 in the final.

Seeds

Draw

References

External links
 Main draw

Murcia Open - Doubles